Dani Antoun Bterrani is the founder of 3dr Models, the largest model making company in the Middle East. 3dr Models works on residential development, government buildings, university buildings, airports, public & private institutions, banking and financial institutions, health care facilities, recreational & sports facilities and more.

Bterrani is also responsible for creating the following companies: 3d Innovations, ADF Properties in Lebanon, Falmoze and BT Investments.

Biography

Personal life
Dani Antoun Bterrani is a Lebanese national. He was born in Kuwait on 2 January 1972  and married in Beirut before moving to the United Arab Emirates (U.A.E) with his wife and three children. He studied in the U.A.E and majored in Economics.

Dani A. Bterrani has made a solid mark in the architectural model industry from a very young age. Born to an architect father, he got his basic training on blueprints and scale model calculations.

Professional life
In 1990, Bterrani opened his first model making workshop, 3d Model Making in Dubai, U.A.E, with only five workers. The effort he put into his models, in terms of details and passion, were quickly recognized by his clients, causing his company and reputation to grow.

In 1998, Bterrani founded the Dubai-based company 3dr Models, which creates miniature versions of commercial, residential and recreational developments. They work with international clients. Now heading 3dr Models, a huge company that has grown to become an internationally recognized firm, with production center boasting an area of 50,000 sq.feet, well equipped state of the art machines, and more than 400 skillful professional model makers, has been a part of more than 5000 projects.
 
In 2002, he further diversified into wooden flooring trading and installation.

Meanwhile, the demand for model making was growing rapidly and in 2005, Bterrani met his current partner, Ray Cheung. With the same model making history in common, they immediately joined forces and created what is now the largest model making facility in the world.

3dr Models and RJ Models currently have 18% of the world's model making market, occupying 12,800 square meters with over 500 in manpower, producing over 60 models per month.

In 2009, Bterrani, diverted into real estate in Lebanon and established ADF Properties, which aimed to develop, rent and sell properties within Lebanon. In 2010, he proposed and initiated the world's largest Santa Clause Village to be built at the peak heights of Lebanon.

In 2011, Bterrani decided to venture into F&B, where the Falmoze brand was created, and aimed to be a new kind of simple healthy food chain of outlets.

In 2012, Bterrani created BT Investments, a holding company that consolidates all his companies under a centralized management with an estimated turnover of over US$150,000,000.

The companies under BT Investments include 3dr Models, ADF Properties, 3D Innovation and Falmoze.

In 2013, Bterrani was featured in Middle East Architect magazine as one of the Power 50 who shaped the architecture of the Middle East (page 62).

In 2014 Bterrani created an offshore company DAMA aimed to capture high end Italian Brands into F&B Outlets, and has its first brand "Trussardi" signed.

Architectural Models

Bterrani and Ray Cheung published a book entitled Architectural Models. It was sold in Hong Kong libraries in its first year, but it now serves as a portfolio and catalog of every model they have made.

Acclaimed Projects

 In 2014, Bterrani's company 3dr Models constructed the model to showcase the new Dubai Creek waterfront. Bterrani was also interviewed by Middle East Architect magazine on adapting to technology (page 60).
 Burj Al Arab, Dubai for Atkins
 HSBC Headquarters, Hong Kong; for Foster and Partners
 Hong Kong Airport, Hong Kong; for Foster and Partners
 Pinnacle Tower, London; for Kohn Pedersen Fox Associates (KPF)
 Palm Island Dubai, Nakheel developers.
 Swiss Re Insurance Headquarters, London; for Foster and Partners
 Tokyo National Stadium, Tokyo; for Zaha Hadid Architects
 World Trade Center Tower One, New York; for Skidmore Owings and Merrill (SOM)

Notable clients

 Aedas
 Carol R Johnson Associates Inc
 Foster and Partners
 HOK
 KPF
 Skidmore, Owings and Merrill LLP
 Emaar

Upcoming Projects
In 2010, Bterrani proposed and initiated plans to create the world's largest Santa Claus Village, which will be built at the peak heights of Lebanon. To date, however, nothing from this project as materialized.

See also
 3dr Models

References

External links
3DR Models

Emirati businesspeople
People from Dubai
Living people
1972 births